Kirkpatrick Glacier is a tributary glacier about  long, flowing west along the south side of the McDonald Heights to enter the east side of Hull Glacier near the coast of Marie Byrd Land, Antarctica. It was mapped by the United States Geological Survey from surveys and U.S. Navy air photos, 1959–65, and was named by the Advisory Committee on Antarctic Names for Commander Thomas W. Kirkpatrick, United States Coast Guard, Ship Operations Officer, U.S. Naval Support Force, Antarctica, during Operation Deep Freeze 1972 and 1973.

See also
 Strawn Pass

References

Glaciers of Marie Byrd Land